Bagworth and Ellistown was a railway station on the Leicester to Burton upon Trent Line, that served the villages of Bagworth and Ellistown in Leicestershire. It was opened by the Midland Railway in 1849 and closed by British Railways in 1964. It was at Bagworth on what is now the B585 road.

History
The Leicester and Swannington Railway had previously opened a Bagworth station in 1832. The Midland Railway took over the line in 1845 and made a number of improvements, including replacing the original Bagworth station with a new one on 1 August 1849. The Ellis family created the colliery and village of Ellistown in 1873 and the Midland renamed the station Bagworth and Ellistown on 1 October 1894.

The Midland Railway became part of the London, Midland and Scottish Railway under the Grouping of 1923. The Leicester to Burton line became part of the London Midland Region of British Railways under the transport nationalisation of 1948. British Railways closed the station to passenger traffic on 7 September 1964.

Reopening proposals
In the 1990s BR planned to restore passenger services to the Leicester to Burton upon Trent Line as the second phase of its Ivanhoe Line project. However, after the privatisation of British Rail in 1995 this phase of the project was discontinued. In 2009 the Association of Train Operating Companies published a £49 million proposal (Connecting Communities: Expanding Access to the Rail Network) to restore passenger services to the line that would include reopening a station at Bagworth.

References

External links
 Bagworth and Ellistown station on navigable O.S. map site

Former Midland Railway stations
Disused railway stations in Leicestershire
Railway stations in Great Britain opened in 1832
Railway stations in Great Britain closed in 1964
Beeching closures in England
Proposed railway stations in England